West Barns is a small village in East Lothian, Scotland. It lies 2 miles west of Dunbar and approximately 28 miles east of Edinburgh. It is close to John Muir Country Park and Belhaven Bay. For many years, it was home to the West Barns Inn and is still home to the West Barns Bowling Club. It was home to a major John Deere farm machinery dealership, that moved to Haddington in 2017, the site being taken over by the Thistly Cross Cider Company. There is also a local amateur football team, West Barns Star. Children of primary-school age attend West Barns Primary, after which they will go to Dunbar Grammar School.

References

External links

Canmore - West Barns Mains (Neolithic) site record
Canmore - West Barns, Edinburgh Road, Distillery site record

Villages in East Lothian